Matt Gay (born March 15, 1994) is an American football placekicker for the Indianapolis Colts of the National Football League (NFL). He played college football at Utah, and was drafted in the fifth round by the Tampa Bay Buccaneers in the 2019 NFL Draft.

Early life and high school career 
Gay was born on March 15, 1994, to John and Suzy Gay. Gay grew up in Orem, Utah, and played both soccer and football at Orem High School, earning first-team honors in both sports. Gay was the first player from Utah to attend the U-17 USA Men's National Team residency program. After graduating in 2012, Gay played two seasons of soccer for the Utah Valley Wolverines.

College career
Prior to the 2017 season, Gay transferred to the Utah Utes football team as a walk-on, becoming the school's seventh consensus All-American. He also won the 2017 Lou Groza Award, being the first Ute to win the award as well as being the school's second-ever finalist. Gay also won the 2017 Vlade Award. That season, he led the nation in field goals and set a new Pac-12 Conference record with 30 field goals. In 2018, Gay set school records for consecutive field goals and field goals in a game, receiving first-team All-Pac-12 honors.

Professional career

Tampa Bay Buccaneers
Gay was drafted by the Tampa Bay Buccaneers in the fifth round, 145th overall, of the 2019 NFL Draft. Gay made his professional debut in the Buccaneers' regular season opener against the San Francisco 49ers. He converted two extra points and one field goal in the loss. On September 22, 2019, against the New York Giants, Gay missed two field goals, one extra point, and had an extra point blocked.

On September 5, 2020, Gay was waived by the Buccaneers after the team signed veteran Ryan Succop.

Indianapolis Colts
On September 15, 2020, Gay was signed to the Indianapolis Colts practice squad. He was released on November 6, but re-signed to the practice squad the next day.

Los Angeles Rams
On November 17, 2020, Gay was signed off the Colts' practice squad by the Los Angeles Rams to replace injured kicker Kai Forbath. In Week 11 against his former team, the Tampa Bay Buccaneers, on Monday Night Football, Gay was a perfect 3 for 3 on extra point attempts and made two of his three field goal attempts, including the game winner late in the fourth quarter, during the 27–24 win. In 2021, Gay converted 32 of 34 field goal attempts and 48 of 49 points after touchdown, and was named to his first Pro Bowl. In an NFC divisional playoff game, also against the Buccaneers, he went 3 for 3 on extra point kicks and converted three of his four field goal tries, including the game winner from 30 yards out as time expired in a 30–27 victory, which sent the Rams to the NFC Championship Game. He won his first Super Bowl title when the Rams beat the Cincinnati Bengals in Super Bowl LVI, converting a 41-yard field goal in the third quarter as well as two points after touchdowns.

On March 15, 2022, the Rams placed an original-round restricted free agent tender on Gay. 

In the 2022 season, Gay was reportedly fined $5,000 due to his pants not covering his knees during a 31-10 opening game loss to the Buffalo Bills in which he made a 57 yard field goal to end the half. In week 14, Gay made the game-winning extra point to seal Baker Mayfield's comeback over the Las Vegas Raiders.

Indianapolis Colts (second stint)
On March 17, 2023, Gay signed a four-year, $22.5 million contract with the Indianapolis Colts. At the time of the signing, Gay's contract was the largest free-agent contract for a kicker in NFL history.

NFL career statistics

Regular season 

|-
! style="text-align:center;"|2019 !! TB
| 16 || 27 || 35 || 77.1 || 2 || 58 || 43 || 48 || 89.6 || 1 || 14.0 || 0 || 124
|-
! style="text-align:center;"|2020 !! LAR
| 7 || 14 || 16 || 87.5 || 0 || 51 || 16 || 16 || 100.0 || 35 || 63.8 || 28 || 58
|-
! style="text-align:center;"|2021 !! style="background:#afe6ba; width:3em;"|LAR
| 17 || 32 || 34 || style="background:#cfecec; width:3em;"| 94.1 || 0 || 55 || 48 || 49 || 98.0 || 102 || 61.9 || 65 || 144
|-
! style="text-align:center;"|2022 !! LAR
| 17 || 28 || 30 || 93.3 || 0 || 58 || 31 || 32 || 96.9 || 77 || 62.9 || 61 || 115
|-
! colspan="2"|Career !! 57 !! 101 !! 115 !! 87.8 !! 2 !! 58 !! 138 !! 145 !! 95.2 !! 215 !! 62.3 !! 154 !! 441
|}

Postseason 

|-
! style="text-align:center"| 2020 !! LAR
| 2 || 4 || 4 || 100.0 || 0 || 40 || 4 || 4 || 100.0 || 11 || 65.1 || 6 || 16
|-
! style="text-align:center"| 2021 !! style="background:#afe6ba; width:3em"| LAR
| 4 || 8 || 10 || 80.0 || 0 || 46 || 11 || 11 || 100.0 || 18 || 63.3 || 11 || 35
|-
! colspan="2"| Career !! 6 !! 12 !! 14 !! 85.7 !! 0 !! 46 !! 15 !! 15 !! 100.0 !! 29 !! 64.0 !! 17 !! 51
|}

Buccaneers franchise records 
Longest field goal by a rookie kicker - 58 yards (September 29, 2019, vs. Los Angeles Rams)
Most successful field goal attempts by a rookie kicker - 27 (tied with Martin Gramatica)
Most successful extra point attempts by a rookie kicker - 43
Most points scored by a rookie kicker - 124

Personal life 
Gay is a member of The Church of Jesus Christ of Latter-day Saints, and served a mission in Houston, though it was cut short due to depression. Gay wears the initials "P.O." on a wristband to every game he plays, in honor of his high school teammate Parker Overly, who was killed in a car accident in 2017.

References

1994 births
Living people
All-American college football players
American football placekickers
American soccer players
Association footballers not categorized by position
Footballers who switched code
Indianapolis Colts players
Los Angeles Rams players
Players of American football from Utah
Sportspeople from Orem, Utah
Utah Utes football players
Utah Valley Wolverines men's soccer players
Tampa Bay Buccaneers players
Soccer players from Utah